Samuel James George Whiteman (born 5 August 1982) is a former New Zealand cricketer who played for Auckland in New Zealand domestic cricket.

Born in Auckland, Whiteman was educated at Saint Kentigern College, and played under-17 representative cricket for Auckland, later touring Australia with a national underage team. In February 2001, he also played several matches for the New Zealand under-19 cricket team, against the touring South African under-19 team. Whiteman debuted for Auckland in the 2002–03 State Shield, against Central Districts at the Eden Park Outer Oval. Playing as an all-rounder, Whiteman played one further List A match in the 2002–03 season, and the following season, in the first-class State Championship, he played two more games. Whiteman subsequently retired from cricket, and moved to Sydney, Australia, to work in the finance industry, having attended Massey University and the Hong Kong University of Science and Technology. As of November 2012, he was a Senior Director at The Corporate Executive Board Company, having previously worked in positions with Virgin Money, ANZ, and the National Australia Bank.

See also
 List of Auckland representative cricketers

References

1982 births
Alumni of the Hong Kong University of Science and Technology
Auckland cricketers
Living people
Massey University alumni
New Zealand businesspeople
New Zealand chief executives
New Zealand cricketers
New Zealand emigrants to Australia
Cricketers from Auckland